Leucocrinum montanum, commonly known as the sand lily, common starlily or mountain lily, is the only species in the monotypic genus Leucocrinum, placed in the family Asparagaceae, and subfamily Agavoideae. It is native to the western United States, primarily in the Rocky Mountains and the Great Basin.

This species is a perennial plant growing from a deep system of fleshy roots. It produces tufts of long, narrow leaves sheathed together at the bases. The inflorescence is an umbel-shaped cluster of flowers amidst the foliage. The fragrant flower has six white tepals atop a narrow tube 2–3 cm long. The species is dimorphic in its pollen production, with two distinct pollen forms occurring in separate populations.

See also

 List of plants known as lily

References

External links
The Jepson eFlora 2013
USDA PLANTS
CalPhotos

Agavoideae
Monotypic Asparagaceae genera
Flora of North America
Flora of the United States
Flora of the North-Central United States
Flora of Nebraska
Flora of North Dakota
Flora of South Dakota
Flora of the Northwestern United States
Flora of Colorado
Flora of Idaho
Flora of Montana
Flora of Oregon
Flora of Wyoming
Flora of the Southwestern United States
Flora of Arizona
Flora of California
Flora of Nevada
Flora of Utah
Flora of the South-Central United States
Flora of New Mexico